Pedro Miguel Juan Buenaventura Bernadino Marqués y García (20 May 1843 – 26 February 1918) was a Spanish composer and violinist.

Life
He was born in Palma, Majorca, the son of a chocolate maker. By the age of four he was already showing unusual musical talent, and by eleven he was playing violin for a Palma opera company, for which he wrote a Fantasía para violin which enjoyed a notable triumph. Between 1859 and 1863 family finance enabled him to study in Paris, after 1861 as a violinist at the Paris Conservatoire with Massard. In 1863 he was admitted to the orchestra of the Théâtre Lyrique, and began studying composition, and instrumentation with Hector Berlioz.

He returned to Majorca when called up to his military service, but in 1866 he resumed his studies at the Madrid Royal Conservatory, studying Violin with Monasterio and Composition with Emilio Arrieta whilst playing in the orchestra of the Teatro de la Zarzuela. After 1878 he was Inspector of the National Music Schools. He also taught singing at the Foundling Girls' School in Madrid, and published a handbook for violin teachers. In 1894 he retired to his home city of Palma. He published some philosophical books like Dios y la inmortalidad del alma. He died there in 1918 aged 74.

Of his five symphonies only the Third was printed during his lifetime. The whole cycle has been edited by Ramón Sobrino in 1993–2003. It was recorded by José Luis Temes, but this album is not released yet.

Works

Stage works
List of zarzuelas by Miguel Marqués
El desengaño de un sueño, incidental music to a 5-act drama by Pedro Calderón de la Barca (1876, Teatro Apolo)

Choral
Mis plegarias íntimas, oratory (1911), consists of 5 movements (Jesús de Nazaret; Jesús bendito; [Adagio for violin and piano]; Esplendorosa luz; Himno al Omnipotente) and El último adiós

Symphonies and symphonic pieces
Symphony No. 1 in B flat major (1869)
Symphony No. 2 in E flat major (1870)
Una noche en la caleta (1871)
Symphony No. 3 in B minor, Op.30 (1876)
La selva negra, overture (1873)
Symphony No. 4 in E major (1878)
Symphony No. 5 in C minor (1880)
Gran fantasía para orquesta y banda militar sobre motivos de zarzuelas modernas (1880)
La cova del Drach (symphonic poem on Mallorcian themes, 1904)
La vida, symphonic poem (1906); consists of 3 movements with an introduction (Allegro, Adagio, Marcha fúnebre)
En la Alhambra, little poem, or suite; consists of 3 movements (Noche embriagadora; Danza de odaliscas; Marcha de héroes al combate)
Oceánica, symphonic poem; consists of 3 movements (Overtura; Andante tranquillo; Vivace scherzando)
Concert overture in C minor
Scherzo in C minor
Overture in C major (lost?)

Marches and polonaises
Gran marcha de concierto No. 1 in C minor (1871)
Gran marcha de concierto No. 2 (1873)
Polonesa de concierto No. 1 in G major (ca.1872)
Polonesa de concierto No. 2 in D major, Op. 17 (ca.1874)
Polonesa de concierto No. 3 in A major (ca.1875)
Gran marcha nupcial (1878)
Polonesa de concierto No. 4 in B major (ca.1880)
Heroica, Marcha de concierto No. 4 (1882)
Polonesa de concierto No. 5 in E major
Polonesa de concierto No. 6 in A major (lost?)

Concertante
Violin «Concerto» in E minor

Chamber
Fantasía for violin and piano
Theme and variations, for violin and piano
Adagio in C major, for a quintet

Other
La canción del marinero, melodia (1872)
Primera lágrima (1872, originally for orchestra; a piano arrangement published in 1878)
La mariposa
Enriqueta, recull de valsos (1875)
Obertura (for wind band, c.1900)
Ave Maria for voice and organ (1911)
A magna inmortalidad, Op. 111(1915)
¡Gloria a Mallorca!, Op. 112 (1915)
Himne en honor de Ramon Llull (1916)
Marcha ascensión de María for chorus and organ (or orchestra)
Te Deum for chorus and organ
Los héroes, prelude
Bellver, prelude
Capricho español
Gran montería
Bendita sea tu pureza for 2 voices with piano
Los pájaros del Paraíso, gran vals fantástico, for violin
Scherzo in A minor

References

External links

 Juan Luis Estelrich. El maestro Marqués, hijo ilustre de Mallorca: sinfonía biográfica en cuatro tiempos. Palma: Imprenta de J. Tous, 1912.
Zarzuela! Composer Biographies – Marqués at www.zarzuela.net Biography and Painting
Xavier Carbonell. Miquel Marqués y el sinfonismo (Historia de las Islas Baleares, T. 19. elMundo / el día de Baleares, 2006)
Pere Miquel Marquès i Garcia in Gran Enciclopèdia Catalana
Biography at Associació Musical de Mestres Directors (assmmd.org)

1843 births
1918 deaths
Spanish classical composers
Spanish male classical composers
Spanish classical violinists
Male classical violinists
Spanish opera composers
Male opera composers
People from Mallorca
Musicians from the Balearic Islands
Madrid Royal Conservatory alumni
Conservatoire de Paris alumni